

Ukrainian Premier League
As of the end of the 2020–21 season, unless stated otherwise.

Team records

Titles
Most League titles:
16, Dynamo Kyiv
Most consecutive League titles:
9, Dynamo Kyiv (1992–93 – 2000–01)
Biggest title-winning margin:
23 points, 2019–20; Shakhtar Donetsk (82 points) over Dynamo Kyiv (59 points).
Smallest title-winning margin: 
0 points:
1992–93, Dynamo Kyiv and Dnipro Dnipropetrovsk both finished on 44 points, but Dynamo Kyiv won the title with a superior goal difference: (+45) over (+31);
2005–06, Shakhtar Donetsk and Dynamo Kyiv both finished on 75 points, but Shakhtar won the title by winning the golden match.
Winning a title with most remaining games:
5 games, Shakhtar Donetsk (2019–20)

Wins
Most wins in a season: 27, Dynamo Kyiv (1999–2000)
26 games: 23, Dynamo Kyiv (2015–16)
28 games: 21, Shakhtar Donetsk (2013–14)
30 games: 27, Dynamo Kyiv (1999–2000)
32 games: 26, Shakhtar Donetsk (2019–20)
34 games: 25, Dynamo Kyiv (1994–95)
Fewest wins in a season: 0, Zirka Kirovohrad (1999–2000)
26 games: 2, Nyva Ternopil (2000–01)
28 games: 2, Metalurh Zaporizhzhia and Tavriya Simferopol (2013–14)
30 games: 0, Zirka Kirovohrad (1999–2000)
32 games: 2, Karpaty Lviv (2019–20)
34 games: 4, Zorya Luhansk (1995–96)

Losses
Most losses in a season: 26, Zorya Luhansk (1995–96)
26 games: 21, Nyva Ternopil (2000–01)
28 games: 22, Tavriya Simferopol (2013–14)
30 games: 22, SC Mykolaiv (1998–99)
32 games: 24, Volyn Lutsk (2016–17)
34 games: 26, Zorya Luhansk (1995–96)
Fewest losses in a season: 0, Dynamo Kyiv (1999–2000, 2006–07, 2014–15), Shakhtar Donetsk (2001–02)
26 games: 0, Shakhtar Donetsk (2001–02), Dynamo Kyiv (2014–15)
28 games: 3, Metalist Kharkiv (2013–14)
30 games: 0, Dynamo Kyiv (1999–2000, 2006–07)
32 games: 2, Shakhtar Donetsk (2016–17, 2019–20)
34 games: 1, Dynamo Kyiv (1993–94, 1994–95)

Points
Most points in a season: 84, Dynamo Kyiv (1999–2000)
26 games: 70, Dynamo Kyiv (2015–16)
28 games: 65, Shakhtar Donetsk (2013–14)
30 games: 84, Dynamo Kyiv (1999–2000)
32 games: 82, Shakhtar Donetsk (2019–20)
34 games: 83, Dynamo Kyiv (1994–95)
Fewest points in a season: 9, Zirka Kirovohrad (1999–2000), Nyva Ternopil (2000–01)
26 games: 9, Nyva Ternopil (2000–01)
28 games: 10, Tavriya Simferopol (2013–14)
30 games: 9, Zirka Kirovohrad (1999–2000)
32 games: 10, Volyn Lutsk (2016–17)
34 games: 16, Zorya Luhansk (1995–96)

Goals scored
Most goals scored in a season: 87, Dynamo Kyiv (1994–95)
26 games: 76, Shakhtar Donetsk (2015–16)
28 games: 65, Shakhtar Donetsk (2013–14)
30 games: 85, Dynamo Kyiv (1999–2000)
32 games: 80, Shakhtar Donetsk (2019–20)
34 games: 87, Dynamo Kyiv (1994–95)
Fewest goals scored in a season: 13, Hoverla Uzhhorod (2015–16)
26 games: 13, Hoverla Uzhhorod (2015–16)
28 games: 15, Tavriya Simferopol (2013–14)
30 games: 15, Borysfen Boryspil (2004–05)
32 games: 17, Volyn Lutsk (2016–17)
34 games: 16, Zorya Luhansk (1995–96)

Goals conceded
Most goals conceded in a season: 80, Zorya-MALS Luhansk (1995–96)
26 games: 65, Nyva Ternopil (2000–01)
28 games: 54, Metalurh Zaporizhzhia (2013–14)
30 games: 69, Torpedo Zaporizhzhia (1997–98)
32 games: 59, Kolos Kovalivka (2019–20)
34 games: 80, Zorya-MALS Luhansk (1995–96)
Fewest goals conceded in a season: 9, Dynamo Kyiv (2001–02)
26 games: 9, Dynamo Kyiv (2001–02)
28 games: 22, Chornomorets Odesa (2013–14)
30 games: 12, Dynamo Kyiv (2011–12)
32 games: 11, Shakhtar Donetsk (2018-19)
34 games: 17, Dynamo Kyiv (1995–96)

Appearances
Most top flight appearances overall: 30 (all seasons since the formation of league in 1992), joint record:
Dynamo Kyiv
Shakhtar Donetsk
Fewest top flight appearances overall: 1, joint record:
Odesa (1992)
Mynai (2020–21)

Participation
 Most participants from one region: During the season 2014–15, Donetsk oblast had 4 participants: Shakhtar Donetsk, Olimpik Donetsk, Metalurh Donetsk and Illichivets Mariupol

Scorelines
Biggest home win: 9:0, Dynamo Kyiv v. Illichivets (31 October 2010)
Biggest away win: 0:7, Nyva Ternopil v. Shakhtar Donetsk (15 June 2001), Kryvbas Kryvyi Rih v. Dynamo Kyiv (22 September 2001), Obolon Kyiv v. Dynamo Kyiv (11 November 2004)

Individual Records
Champion with clubs: Oleksandr Holovko (Tavriya Simferopol and Dynamo Kyiv), Oleksandr Rybka (Dynamo Kyiv and Shakhtar Donetsk), Júnior Moraes (Dynamo Kyiv and Shakhtar Donetsk)
First Premier League goal: Anatoliy Mushchinka (for Karpaty Lviv–Chornomorets Odessa, 6 March 1992)
First hat-trick: Ivan Hetsko (for Chornomorets Odesa–Nyva Vn., 4 April 1992)
Most goals in a game: 4, joint record:
Yuri Hudymenko for SC Tavriya Simferopol (Tavriya Simferopol–Temp Shepetivka (6–0), 9 June 1992)
Serhii Rebrov for Dynamo Kyiv (Dynamo Kyiv–Kryvbas Kryvyi Rih (5–0), 13 October 1996)
Oleh Matviiv for Shakhtar Donetsk (Shakhtar Donetsk–Torpedo Zaporizhzhia (9–1), 16 May 1997)
Oleksandr Haidash for SC Tavriya Simferopol (SC Tavriya Simferopol–FC Torpedo Zaporizhzhia (5–0), 7 September 1997)
Ivan Hetsko for Karpaty Lviv (Karpaty Lviv–Dnipro Dnipropetrovsk (4–0), 29 August 1999)
Ivan Hetsko for Kryvbas Kryvyi Rih (Kryvbas Kryvyi Rih–Nyva Ternopil (5–1), 14 May 2000)
Georgi Demetradze for Dynamo Kyiv (Nyva Ternopil–Dynamo Kyiv (3–7), 27 August 2000)
Brandão for Shakhtar Donetsk (FC Metalist Kharkiv–Shakhtar Donetsk (1–5), 20 August 2005)
Artem Milevskyi for Dynamo Kyiv (Dynamo Kyiv–Illichivets Mariupol (9–0), 31 October 2010)
Matheus for FC Dnipro Dnipropetrovsk (Dnipro Dnipropetrovsk–FC Volyn Lutsk (5–1), 15 April 2014)
Yevhen Seleznyov for FC Dnipro Dnipropetrovsk (Stal Dniprodzerzhynsk–Dnipro Dnipropetrovsk) (0–6), 17 October 2015)
Stanislav Kulish for FC Oleksandriya (Oleksandriya-Volyn Lutsk) (6–0), 25 February 2017)
Most expensive incoming transfer fee paid:
€25,000,000, Bernard, in 2013, from Atlético Mineiro to Shakhtar Donetsk
€20,000,000, Nery Castillo, in 2007, from Olympiacos to Shakhtar Donetsk
€18,000,000, Pedrinho, in 2021, from Benfica to Shakhtar Donetsk
€15,000,000, Dmytro Chyhrynskyi, in 2010, from Barcelona to Shakhtar Donetsk
€15,000,000, Fred, in 2013, from Internacional to Shakhtar Donetsk
€15,000,000, Taison, in 2013, from Metalist Kharkiv to Shakhtar Donetsk
€15,000,000, Tetê, in 2019, from Grêmio to Shakhtar Donetsk
€14,000,000, Matuzalém, in 2004, from Brescia Calcio to Shakhtar Donetsk
€14,000,000, Willian, in 2007, from Corinthians to Shakhtar Donetsk
Most expensive outgoing transfer fee paid:
€70,000,000, Mykhailo Mudryk, in 2023, from Shakhtar Donetsk to Chelsea F.C.
€60,000,000, Fred, in 2018, from Shakhtar Donetsk to Manchester United
€50,000,000, Alex Teixeira, in 2016, from Shakhtar Donetsk to Jiangsu Suning
€40,000,000, Fernandinho, in 2013, from Shakhtar Donetsk to Manchester City
€34,500,000, Willian, in 2013, from Shakhtar Donetsk to Anzhi Makhachkala
€30,000,000, Douglas Costa, in 2015, from Shakhtar Donetsk to FC Bayern Munich
€27,900,000, Henrikh Mkhitaryan, in 2013, from Shakhtar Donetsk to Borussia Dortmund
€25,000,000, Dmytro Chyhrynskyi, in 2009, from Shakhtar Donetsk to FC Barcelona
€25,000,000, Andriy Yarmolenko, in 2017, from Dynamo Kyiv to Borussia Dortmund
€24,000,000, Andriy Shevchenko, in 1999, from Dynamo Kyiv to A.C. Milan

All-time Vyscha Liha scorers

All-time Vyscha Liha foreign scorers

Active Vyscha Liha scorers

All-time Vyscha Liha appearance leaders

All-time Vyscha Liha foreign appearance leaders

Active Vyscha Liha appearance

Goalscoring categories

Most prolific all-time Vyscha Liha scorers:

Single season Vyscha Liha topscorers:

Goalkeeping categories

Best all-time Vyscha Liha goalkeeper:

Most all-time Vyscha Liha goals allowed:

Best single season Vyscha Liha goalkeeper:

Ukrainian Cup
As of the end of the 2020–21 season, unless stated otherwise.

Highest attendance: 81,000 – Shakhtar Donetsk 3–2  Dynamo Kyiv at NSC Olimpiyskiy, 2002 Ukrainian Cup Final (26 May 2002)

Final

Team records
Most wins: 13, joint record:
 Shakhtar Donetsk (1995, 1997, 2001, 2002, 2004, 2008, 2011, 2012, 2013, 2016, 2017, 2018, 2019)
 Dynamo Kyiv (1993, 1996, 1998, 1999, 2000, 2003, 2005, 2006, 2007, 2014, 2015, 2020, 2021)
Most consecutive wins: 4, Shakhtar Donetsk (2016–2019)
Most appearances in finals: 19, Shakhtar Donetsk (1995, 1997, 2001, 2002, 2003, 2004, 2005, 2007, 2008, 2009, 2011, 2012, 2013, 2014, 2015, 2016, 2017, 2018, 2019)
Longest consecutive appearances in finals: 9, Shakhtar Donetsk (2011–2019)
Most Final appearances without win: 3, Dnipro (1995, 1997, 2004)
Longest winning streak in finals: 5, Dynamo Kyiv (1993, 1996, 1998, 1999, 2000)
Most defeats in finals: 6, Shakhtar Donetsk (2003, 2005, 2007, 2009, 2014, 2015)
Biggest win: 4 goals, Shakhtar Donetsk 4–0 Inhulets Petrove (2019)
Most goals in a final: 5, joint record:
Shakhtar Donetsk 3–2  Dynamo Kyiv (2002)
Tavriya Simferopol 3–2  Metalurh Donetsk (2010)
Most red cards in a final: 5, Shakhtar Donetsk 2–0 Dynamo Kyiv (2008)
Least yellow/red cards in a final: 0 (no cards shown), Chornomorets Odessa 0–0  Tavriya Simferopol (1994)

Individual records
Most wins: 10, Oleksandr Shovkovskyi (Dynamo Kyiv) (1996, 1998, 1999, 2000, 2003, 2005, 2006, 2007, 2014, 2015)
Fastest goal: 1st minute, Andriy Shevchenko, Dynamo Kyiv 2–1 CSKA Kyiv, 1998
Latest goal: 120th minute, Serhiy Atelkin, Shakhtar Donetsk 2–1  CSKA Kyiv, 2001
Most goals in finals: 4, Andriy Shevchenko (Dynamo Kyiv), Serhiy Atelkin (Shakhtar Donetsk)

Managerial records
Most wins: 7, Mircea Lucescu (Shakhtar Donetsk, 2004, 2008, 2011, 2012, 2013, 2016; Dynamo Kyiv, 2021)

Host of the finals
NSC Olimpiyskiy in Kyiv has hosted the most Ukrainian Cup Finals with 18, including all 16 finals up to 2006–07 season, and 2 Finals after. Starting from the 2007–08 season the final is held at different stadiums, the other stadiums which hosted multiple games are OSC Metalist in Kharkiv (5), Dnipro-Arena (2) and Arena Lviv (2). Yuvileiny Stadium in Sumy, Oleksiy Butovsky Vorskla Stadium in Poltava, Slavutych Arena in Zaporizhia and City Stadium in Ternopil hosted the final once.

Teams by semi-final appearances

Overall
Most Ukrainian Cup games played: 157, Shakhtar Donetsk
Most Ukrainian Cup games won: 118, Dynamo Kyiv
Most Ukrainian Cup games lost: 39, Chornomorets Odessa
Most Ukrainian Cup games drawn: 22, Shakhtar Donetsk
Most Ukrainian Cup goals scored: 359, Dynamo Kyiv
Most Ukrainian Cup goals conceded: 135, Volyn Lutsk
Highest Ukrainian Cup goal difference: +265, Dynamo Kyiv

All-time Ukrainian Cup top scorers

Ukrainian Super Cup
As of the end of the 2021 edition, unless stated otherwise.

Team records
Most wins: 9, joined record: Dynamo Kyiv, Shakhtar Donetsk
Most consecutive wins: 4, Shakhtar Donetsk (2012–2015)
Most appearances: 17, Shakhtar Donetsk
Longest consecutive appearances: 12, Shakhtar Donetsk (2010–2021)
Most goals: 8, Shakhtar Donetsk 7–1 Tavriya Simferopol (2010)

Most successful clubs overall

Key

Performance by club
Record competitions winners shown in bold.

Data through 22 September 2021.

References
 Ukrainian Football Database Spreadsheet – Copy link location directly to your URL bar to access

 
Ukraine